Hamid Ahmadieh is an Iranian ophthalmologist, medical scientist, and pioneer specializing on the retina of the eye. He is also the founder of Iranian Vitreoretina Society.

He is currently a professor of ophthalmology at Shahid Beheshti University of Medical Sciences. He is also the director of vitreoretinal service at Labbafinejad Medical Center.

Early life and education
Hamid Ahmadieh was born in Tehran but spent his early life in Yazd, Iran, since his father had a career as a physician there. He received his diploma in Natural Sciences from Iranshahr High School in 1971 getting the first rank in the whole country. Ahmadieh obtained his M.D. degree from Tehran University of Medical Sciences in 1978. Then he did residency in ophthalmology at Farabi Eye Hospital from 1979 to 1982. Afterwards, he started a vitreoretinal fellowship at Labbafinejad Medical Center, Shahid Beheshti University of Medical Sciences in 1984 and finished it in 1986.

Career 
Ahmadieh began his academic job by joining Shahid Beheshti University of Medical Sciences Faculty as an assistant professor of ophthalmology in 1986. At the same time he became the director of Vitreoretinal Service at Labbafinejad Medical Center and improved it scientifically making it a center from which many well known Retina Specialists were graduated. Ahmadieh was promoted to an associate professor of ophthalmology in 1993 and to a professor of ophthalmology in 1999.

Ahmadieh was the director of Residency Training Program (Ophthalmology) at Labbafinejad Medical Center and Shahid Beheshti University of Medical Sciences from 1989 to 1996. He was a member of Iranian Board of Ophthalmology from 1987 to 2008 and was a member of the executive committee of Iranian Society of Ophthalmology (IrSO) from 1986 to 1996. As the president of the first Iranian Congress of Ophthalmology, he played a substantial role in the establishment of the annual meetings of IrSO. Ahmadieh founded Iranian Vitreoretina Society in 2007 and has been the head of it since then. He is also a member of the Board of Middle East Vitreoretina Society (MEAVRS)  at present.

Ahmadieh is the founder and editor-in-chief of the Journal of Ophthalmic and Vision Research  and is a reviewer for Ophthalmology, Acta Ophthalmologica, Journal of Clinical and Experimental Ophthalmology, Retina (journal), Ophthalmic Research (journal) and Indian Journal of Ophthalmology. He is also on the editorial board of ISRN Ophthalmology Journal. Ahmadieh is currently the research deputy of the Ophthalmic Research Center .

Ahmadieh has published many papers in well-known international medical journals. He has also given numerous presentations at international meetings of ophthalmology. Due to his publications and presentations, he has received two prestigious awards, namely, International Achievement Award in 2006 from the American Academy of Ophthalmology  and Honor Award in 2010 from the American Society of Retina Specialists.

Honors and awards
 International Achievement Award, American Academy of Ophthalmology, 2006 
 Honor Award, American Society of Retina Specialists, 2010
 Best Paper Presenter, American Academy of Ophthalmology Annual Meeting, 2008
 Best Poster Presenter, American Academy of Ophthalmology Annual Meeting, 2007
 Distinguished Ophthalmologist Award, Iranian Society of Ophthalmology, 2003
 Distinguished Researcher Award, Shahid Beheshti University of Medical Sciences, 2003
 Distinguished Researcher Award, The 9th Razi Research Festival in Medical Sciences, 2003
 Outstanding Researcher with High Citation, The 12th Razi Research Festival in Medical Sciences, 2006
 Distinguished Researcher Award, Shahid Beheshti University of Medical Sciences, 2009
 Distinguished Researcher Award, Shahid Beheshti University of Medical Sciences, 2011

References

External links 
 Hamid Ahmadieh's webpage on Ophthalmic Research Center (Shahid Beheshti University of Medical Sciences) 

Living people
Iranian ophthalmologists
Physicians from Tehran
1953 births